Rodney was a New Zealand parliamentary electorate, returning one Member of Parliament to the House of Representatives. The last MP for Rodney was Mark Mitchell of the National Party. He held this position from 2011 until the electorate was replaced with  Whangaparāoa in 2020. Mitchell stood for and won that seat.

Population centres
The 1941 New Zealand census had been postponed due to World War II, so the 1946 electoral redistribution had to take ten years of population growth and movements into account. The North Island gained a further two electorates from the South Island due to faster population growth. The abolition of the country quota through the Electoral Amendment Act, 1945 reduced the number and increased the size of rural electorates. None of the existing electorates remained unchanged, 27 electorates were abolished, 19 electorates were created for the first time, and eight former electorates were re-established, including Rodney.

The 1981 census had shown that the North Island had experienced further population growth, and three additional general seats were created through the 1983 electoral redistribution, bringing the total number of electorates to 95. The South Island had, for the first time, experienced a population loss, but its number of general electorates was fixed at 25 since the 1967 electoral redistribution. More of the South Island population was moving to Christchurch, and two electorates were abolished, while two electorates were recreated. In the North Island, six electorates were newly created, three electorates were recreated (including Rodney), and six electorates were abolished.

The 1987 electoral redistribution took the continued population growth in the North Island into account, and two additional general electorates were created, bringing the total number of electorates to 97. In the South Island, the shift of population to Christchurch had continued. Overall, three electorates were newly created, three electorates were recreated, and four electorates were abolished (including Rodney). All of those electorates were in the North Island. Changes in the South Island were restricted to boundary changes.

Rodney covers an area of the northern Auckland region from Warkworth in the north, south through the Hibiscus Coast to Auckland's northern urban fringe. High population growth in north and west Auckland has led to Rodney shrinking – Helensville and Kumeu were taken out in 1999, and the next major town to be removed was Wellsford after the 2006 census.

At the 2020 general election, Rodney will be abolished, with the northern section around Warkworth being merged with most of Helensville into Kaipara ki Mahurangi, and the southern section becoming the bulk of the new Whangaparāoa electorate.

History

Harry Farnall 1871–1872 (resigned); John Sheehan 1872–1879 (elected for Thames in 1879); Seymour Thorne George 1879–1884 (retired); and William Pollock Moat 1884–1890 (retired).

Rodney was again recreated ahead of the change to mixed-member proportional (MMP) voting in 1996. Its original incarnation was coterminous with the district for which it is named – most of the old Albany seat minus its eponymous town, with a large section of Kaipara tacked onto the northern fringe. Both of these seats were held by National MPs – Lockwood Smith in Kaipara and then Deputy Prime Minister Don McKinnon in Albany. In the 1996 election, Mike Lee came second standing as an Independent.

Members of Parliament

Key

List MPs
Members of Parliament elected from party lists in elections where that person also unsuccessfully contested the Rodney electorate. Unless otherwise stated, all MPs terms began and ended at general elections.

Election results

2017 election

2014 election

2011 election

Electorate (as at 26 November 2011): 49,407

2008 election

2005 election

1999 election
Refer to Candidates in the New Zealand general election 1999 by electorate#Rodney for a list of candidates.

Table footnotes

Notes

References

External links 
 Electorate profile, Parliamentary Library

New Zealand electorates in the Auckland Region
Politics of the Auckland Region
1870 establishments in New Zealand
1890 disestablishments in New Zealand
1978 disestablishments in New Zealand
1987 disestablishments in New Zealand
1946 establishments in New Zealand
1984 establishments in New Zealand
1996 establishments in New Zealand